Stav Zalait (born October 4, 1995) is an Israeli footballer who plays for Hapoel Azor.

References

External links
 

1995 births
Living people
Israeli footballers
Maccabi Netanya F.C. players
Hapoel Petah Tikva F.C. players
Hapoel Nir Ramat HaSharon F.C. players
Sektzia Ness Ziona F.C. players
Beitar Kfar Saba F.C. players
Hapoel Mahane Yehuda F.C. players
Hakoah Maccabi Amidar Ramat Gan F.C. players
Hapoel Kfar Shalem F.C. players
F.C. Holon Yermiyahu players
F.C. Tira players
Hapoel Azor F.C. players
Liga Leumit players
Israeli Premier League players
Footballers from Herzliya
Association football midfielders